The Very Best of The Chipmunks with David Seville is a 1975 music album by Alvin and the Chipmunks, released by United Artists, containing ten tracks, and apparently re-released in 1995 by Capitol Records containing nine tracks.

Track listing

Side One
 "The Chipmunk Song (Christmas Don't Be Late)"
 "Alvin's Harmonica"
 "Ragtime Cowboy Joe"
 "She Loves You"
 "Twinkle, Twinkle, Little Star" (not on the Capitol re-release)

Side Two
 "Witch Doctor"
 "Do-Re-Mi"
 "Tonight You Belong to Me"
 "America the Beautiful"
 "Supercalifragilisticexpialidocious"

Source: The Mad Music Archive

References

1995 greatest hits albums
Alvin and the Chipmunks albums
United Artists Records compilation albums